Восточное is a rural locality (a selo) and the administrative center of Vostochny Selsoviet of Ikryaninsky District, Astrakhan Oblast, Russia. The population was 767 as of 2010. There are 15 streets.

Geography 
Vostochnoye is located 16 km northwest of Ikryanoye (the district's administrative centre) by road. Dzhamba is the nearest rural locality.

References 

Rural localities in Ikryaninsky District